Lessons and Legacies is a biannual conference in Holocaust studies organized by the Holocaust Educational Foundation and first held in 1989. The conference has produced more than ten volumes of conference proceedings, which are published by Northwestern University Press. Historian Anna Hájková writes that it is "widely acknowledged to be the central academic conference for Holocaust study and research".

Volumes

Lessons and Legacies XV, The Holocaust: Global Perspectives and National Narratives, Washington University in St. Louis, November 2018
Lessons and Legacies XVI: The Holocaust: Rethinking Paradigms in Research and Representation postponed to November 2021 due to COVID-19 pandemic

Awards
Volume I won the Anisfield-Wolf Book Award for nonfiction in 1992.

References

External links
Northwestern University Press
Humanities conferences
Holocaust studies
Northwestern University Press books
1989 establishments in Illinois